Nikolai Mikhailovich Tseretelli (Russian: Николай Михайлович Церетелли) 1 October 1890 – 6 February 1942 was a Soviet stage and silent film actor of Uzbek origin.

In 1923, the German artist Max Beckmann drew a portrait of him with "sly, sideways glance and the warm, wry smile".

Filmography
Papirosnitsa ot Mosselproma (1924) as Latugin, cameraman
Aelita (1924) as Engineer Los/Spiridinov
Nabat (1917)
Zelyonyy pauk (1916)
Chess of Life (1916) as Mark Rudnetskiy

See also
Igor Ilyinsky
Anatoli Ktorov

References 

Male actors from the Russian Empire
Soviet male film actors
Soviet male silent film actors
Male actors from Moscow
1890 births
1942 deaths